Burakov is a Russian masculine surname, its feminine counterpart is Burakova. Notable people with the surname include:

Aleksandr Burakov (born 1987), Russian football player
Viktor Burakov (born 1955), Ukrainian sprinter 

Russian-language surnames